Melinda Jane Young (born 28 August 1971)  is a wheelchair basketball player from Australia. She was born in Melbourne, Victoria. She was part of the silver medal-winning Australia women's national wheelchair basketball team at the 2004 Summer Paralympics.

References

Paralympic wheelchair basketball players of Australia
Paralympic silver medalists for Australia
Wheelchair category Paralympic competitors
Wheelchair basketball players at the 2004 Summer Paralympics
Living people
Medalists at the 2004 Summer Paralympics
1971 births
Paralympic medalists in wheelchair basketball